Umm Tini  is a Syrian village in Sinjar Nahiyah in Maarrat al-Nu'man District, Idlib.  According to the Syria Central Bureau of Statistics (CBS), its population was 701 at the 2004 census.

References 

Populated places in Maarat al-Numan District